Meerut district, is one of the districts of Uttar Pradesh state of India, and Meerut is the district headquarters. Meerut district is also a part of the Meerut division. The administrative head of district of Meerut is a District Magistrate while the administrative head of Meerut Division is Divisional Commissioner, an IAS officer.

History 
The district was established under British rule in 1818 and, on establishment, constituted the then tehsils of Meerut, Ghaziabad, Mawana, Baghpat, Sardhana and Hapur. These now constitute the districts of Meerut, Ghaziabad, Hapur, Bagpat, Muzaffarnagar, Bulandshahr and a part of Gautam Buddh Nagar district.

Geography 
Meerut district lies between 28°57’ to 29°02’ North latitude and 77°40’ to 77°45’ East longitude in the Indo-Gangetic plains of India. It is bound on the north by Muzaffarnagar district, in the south by Bulandshahar district while Ghaziabad and Baghpat districts form the southern and western limits. The river Ganges forms the eastern boundary and separates the district from Moradabad district and Bijnor district. The Hindon forms the western boundary and separates the district from Baghpat. The ground is not rocky and there are no mountains. The soil is composed of pleistocene and sub-recent alluvial sediments transported and deposited by river action from the Himalayan region. These alluvial deposits are unconsolidated. Lithologically, sediments consist of clay, silt and fine to coarse sand. Land is very fertile for growing crops, especially wheat, sugarcane and vegetables.

Administration 
The administrative head of district of Meerut is a District Magistrate while the administrative head of Meerut Division is Divisional Commissioner, an IAS officer.

Tehsil 
The District administration comprises three tehsils, namely:
 Meerut
 Mawana
 Sardhana

Block 
District is divided into 12 blocks, namely:
 Meerut
 Rajpura
 Kharkhauda
 Jani
 Rohata
 Mawana
 Parikshitgarh
 Machhara
 Hastinapur
 Sardhana
 Daurala
 Saroorpur

Politics 
Meerut is in part served by  the Meerut-Hapur constituency for elections to the Lok Sabha of the Parliament of India.

, the district has seven Vidhan Sabha(Legislative Assembly) constituencies, which return members of the Legislative Assembly of Uttar Pradesh. These are Siwalkhas, Sardhana, Hastinapur (which is reserved for candidates from the Scheduled Castes), Kithore, Meerut Cantonment, Meerut, and Meerut South.

Demographics 
According to the 2011 census Meerut district has a population of 3,443,689, roughly equal to the nation of Panama or the US state of Connecticut. This gives it a ranking of 94th in India (out of a total of 640). Its population growth rate over the decade 2001-2011 was 1.489%. Meerut has a sex ratio of 886 females for every 1000 males, lower than the state average of 908; while the child sex ratio is 852, lower than the state average of 899. The district has a literacy rate of 72.84%, higher than the state average of 69.72%. Scheduled Castes made up 18.12% of the population.

According to the 2001 census, the district ranked 6th in terms of population density in Uttar Pradesh. The district had an average literacy rate of 65.96%, higher than the national average of 64.8% and the state average of 57.36%. 16.66% of the population was under 6 years of age. The percentage of Muslim population over 36% (one of the largest among the cities of India).

At the time of the 2011 Census of India, 86.55% of the population of the district spoke Hindi, 12.43% Urdu and 0.47% Punjabi as their first language.

Area-Based

Religion 

Hindus are the majority community in the district, although Muslims are a significant minority. There are small numbers of Sikhs, Jains and Christians in the district. There were 1987 Meerut communal riots and 2014 Meerut riots.

The Roman Catholic Diocese of Meerut is active in the district.

Areas

Cities 
 Meerut

Towns

Villages

References

External links 

 Official website

 
Districts of Uttar Pradesh